Franco Anthony Medina Soto (born 18 July 1999) is a Peruvian footballer who plays as a right-back for Peruvian Primera División side Deportivo Municipal.

Club career

Alianza Lima
Medina is a product of Alianza Lima. In June 2018, Medina signed his first professional contract with Alianza Lima after an impressive season with the club's reserve team. However, he wasn't used on the first team yet and therefore, he was loaned out to César Vallejo for the 2019 season, to gain some experience. Medina became a regular player for César Vallejo, playing 19 games in the Peruvian Primera División.

In the beginning of 2020, he suffered from a dislocated shoulder after a game for the U-23 national team and was set to be out for several months.

Deportivo Municipal
On 2 January 2021 it was confirmed, that Medina had signed with Deportivo Municipal for the 2021 season. He got his debut for the team in the first game of the season against Sport Huancayo on 12 March 2021.

International career
In May 2019, Medina was called up for the Peruvian U23 national team who was going to play the 2019 Pan American Games. He was later also called up for the 2020 CONMEBOL Pre-Olympic Tournament.

References

External links
 
 

Living people
1999 births
Association football defenders
Peruvian footballers
Peruvian Primera División players
Club Alianza Lima footballers
Club Deportivo Universidad César Vallejo footballers
Deportivo Municipal footballers
Footballers from Lima